Hwidiem is a small town in the Asutifi district, a district in the Ahafo Region of Ghana.

Education
Hwidiem is known for the Hwidiem Secondary School.  The school is a second cycle institution.

Healthcare
The St. Elizabeth Hospital is located in Hwidiem.

See also
 Asutifi North (Ghana parliament constituency)
 Asutifi South (Ghana parliament constituency)

References

Populated places in the Ahafo Region